Conquest of Space is a 1955 American science fiction film.

Conquest of Space or The Conquest of Space may also refer to:
 Conquest of Space (TV series), a 1969 Canadian television series
 The Conquest of Space, a 1949 speculative science book by Willy Ley
 The Conquest of Space (1931), a 1931 nonfiction book by David Lasser

See also
 Man Will Conquer Space Soon!, a series of 1950s-era Collier's articles
 Space Race, the Cold War competition between the US and USSR to conquer space milestones